Arab Israel Bank (Ai Bank) is a bank in Israel established in 1961. It is owned by Bank Leumi and caters to the country's Arab population.

In 1971, Bank Leumi acquired Arab Israel Bank (established 1960), which serves mainly the Arab citizens of Israel in the north of the country. Ai Bank has 35 branches located in Israel's northern and Triangle regions.

The bank is primarily focused on retail banking and has  around 470 employees.

See also

Economy of Israel
List of banks
List of banks in Israel

References

Banks of Israel
Financial services companies of Israel
Banks established in 1961
Israeli brands